The 1996–97 Los Angeles Kings season, was the Kings' 30th season in the National Hockey League (NHL). The Kings missed the playoffs for the fourth consecutive year.

Offseason

Regular season

Final standings

Schedule and results

Player statistics

Regular season
Scoring

Goaltending

Awards and records

Transactions
The Kings were involved in the following transactions during the 1996–97 season.

Trades

Free agent signings

Free agents lost

Waivers

Draft picks
Los Angeles's draft picks at the 1996 NHL Entry Draft held at the Kiel Center in St. Louis, Missouri.

See also
1996–97 NHL season

References
 

Los
Los Angeles Kings seasons
Los
Los Angeles Kings season
Los Angeles Kings season